Never Enough is the third album by singer-songwriter Melissa Etheridge, released in 1992 (see 1992 in music).  the album has sold 997,000 copies in the United States alone, according to Nielsen SoundScan.

Track listing
All tracks written by Melissa Etheridge, except where noted

"Ain't It Heavy" – 4:20
"2001" – 4:36
"Dance Without Sleeping" (Etheridge, Mauricio-Fritz Lewak, Kevin McCormick) – 5:40
"Place Your Hand" – 3:24
"Must Be Crazy for Me" – 3:43
"Meet Me in the Back" – 4:02
"The Boy Feels Strange" – 4:31
"Keep It Precious" – 6:13
"The Letting Go" – 3:05
"It's for You" (Etheridge, Kevin McCormick) – 5:41

Personnel
Melissa Etheridge - vocals, acoustic, electric guitar and 12-string guitars, piano
Mark Goldenberg - electric guitars
Steuart Smith - guitars
Kevin McCormick - bass, high-strung guitar, backing vocals
Scott Thurston - keyboards
Mauricio-Fritz Lewak – drums, percussion, backing vocals
Richard Gibbs - keyboards on "It's For You"
Ian McLagan - Hammond organ and piano on "Ain't It Heavy"
Dermot Mulroney - cello on "Place Your Hand"
Debra Dobkin – percussion on "Keep It Precious"

Production
Arranged and produced by Melissa Etheridge and Kevin McCormick
Recorded by Gabe Veltri
Mixed by Kevin McCormick and Gabe Veltri; assisted by John Aguto, Greg Goldman and Randy Wine
Mastered by Stephen Marcussen
Art Direction by Norm Ung
Photography by Dennis Keeley

Charts

Weekly charts

Year-end charts

Singles – Billboard (North America)

Certifications

References

Melissa Etheridge albums
1992 albums
Island Records albums

es:Never Enough